Finchcocks is an early Georgian manor house in Goudhurst, Kent. For 45 years it housed a large, visitor-friendly museum of historical keyboard instruments, displaying a collection of harpsichords, clavichords, fortepianos, square pianos, organs and other musical instruments. The museum was run by the owners of the house, Richard and Katrina Burnett. It is now owned by Neil and Harriet Nichols who use it as a family home and a venue for residential piano courses.

In 2017, the museum was closed and the collection sold.

The house

The house was built in 1725 and named after the family who lived on the site in the 13th century. It is noted for its brickwork and has a dramatic front elevation attributed to Thomas Archer. There is parkland to the front and a garden to the rear with wide lawns, mature shrub borders, an orchard for wild flowers, and a walled garden. There are extensive views over the Kentish landscape of park, farmland, and hop-gardens.

The house, with impressive facades both back and front, is deceptive – the interior is a series of interconnecting rooms without corridors and only 13 metres deep.  Those rooms, with their high ceilings and oak panelling, provided an ideal setting for music performed on period instruments; the house and instruments were used regularly for recordings by leading exponents of early music such as Trevor Pinnock, Simon Preston and Nigel North. In addition to that, there is a jazz club which was founded by Alastair Laurence of the Broadwood Piano company and was developed by Roan Kearsey-Lawson into a premier jazz venue where international artists have appeared including Frank Holder and Duncan Lamont. The club has also been featured on BBC One television.

The Finchcocks collection

Finchcocks was acquired by Richard Burnett, a fortepianist, in 1970. The Adlam Burnett workshop (founded by Derek Adlam and Richard Burnett) was set up at the house and enabled instrument makers to produce copies of historical keyboard instruments in an ideal environment, learning from the construction of many originals. The building housed the Katrina and Richard Burnett collection of over 100 historical keyboard instruments; about forty of which were fully restored to playing condition. These could be seen and heard whenever the house was open to the public; it was one of the few collections of historical instruments at which people were welcome to play them themselves. With the Burnetts' retirement in 2015, the museum closed and many of its instruments were auctioned off for charity. The auction catalogue documented the instruments meticulously and in the auction many fetched two or three times the estimated prices. A total of £835,462 was raised from the sale of the collection.

Fourteen instruments from the collection were retained and form the Richard Burnett Heritage Collection, to be housed in 2018 at the Burnetts' home in Tunbridge Wells.

Similarly, there is a collection of musical pictures, prints and an exhibition on the theme of London's 18th-century pleasure gardens such as Vauxhall and Ranelagh Gardens.

Historical instruments in the collection

Clavichords

Lindholm and Söderström: unfretted, 1806
Georg Friedrich Schmahl: fretted, 1807

Harpsichords

Joachim Antunes: single manual, 1785
Thomas Blasser: double manual, 1744
C.A.: bentside spinet, c.1700
Fr. Ant. L.: single manual, 1716
Gregori: single manual, c.1697
Onofrio Guarracino: virginal, 1668
Jacob Kirckman: double manual, 1756
Joseph Mahoon: bentside spinet, 1742 (today in Geelvinck Early Piano Museum, Amsterdam, Netherlands)

Organs

Anon: chamber organ, c.1680; chamber organ, c.1790; miniature free-reed organ, c.1860
Alexandre Père et Fils: harmonium, 1859
Autophone Company: cob organ (portable free-reed barrel organ), c.1885
John Avery: chamber organ, 1792
William Ayton: barrel organ, c.1800
John Byfield: chamber organ, 1766
Longman and Broderip: barrel organ, c.1790

Pianos

 Anon: portable square piano, c.1815; lyre piano (possibly Schleip, Berlin), c.1825; domestic barrel piano, 19th century
 Gustaf and Wilhelm Andersson: barrel piano, c.1890
 Bayes and Company: square piano, 1793
 Frederick Beale: upright euphonicon, c.1842
 Adam Beyer: square piano, 1777
 John Brinsmead and Sons: upright, c.1855
 John Broadwood and Son: grand, 1792; square, 1795; square, 1798; grand, 1801; square, c.1805
 John Broadwood and Sons: grand, c.1810; square, c.1820; grand, 1823; cabinet upright, c.1830; grand, 1846; square, 1858; grand, 1859 (now at Hammerwood Park, East Grinstead, Sussex); upright, c.1870
 Muzio Clementi and Company: grand, c.1800; upright grand, 1804; square, c.1815; square, c.1815; square, c.1815; grand, c.1815; grand, c.1821; grand, 1822; cabinet upright, c.1825; cabinet upright, c.1825
 Collard and Collard: square, c.1835; grand, c.1835; grand, c.1840
 William Edwards: cabinet upright, c.1825 
 W.J. Ennever and Son: upright, c.1850
 Sébastien Érard: square, 1792
 Erard Frères: grand, 1801
 Erard: upright, c.1860; grand, 1866
 Johann Fritz: grand, c.1815
 Christopher Ganer: square, c.1780; square, 1784
 Conrad Graf: grand, c.1820; grand, 1826
 Crang Hancock: transverse grand, 1779
 Carl Henschker: grand, c.1840
 Mathias Jakesch: grand, 1832
 Jones, Round and Company: upright grand, c.1810 (today in Geelvinck Early Piano Museum, Amsterdam, Netherlands and on loan at Huis Midwoud, Midwoud)
 William Kearsing: square, c.1830
 Knowles and Allen: square, c.1805
 Sebastian Lengerer: grand, 1793
 Longman, Lukey and Company: square, c.1780
 Frederick Mathuschek: square, 1873
 Sébastien Mercier: upright, 1831
 Henri Pape: upright piano-console, 1841; upright piano-console, 1843
 Ignace Pleyel et Compagnie: upright, c.1840; grand, 1842
 Michael Rosenberger: grand, c.1800
 Leopold Sauer: pyramid piano, c.1805
 William Southwell: upright square, c.1800
 Robert Stodart: grand, 1787
 William and Matthew Stodart: grand, 1802 (now at Hammerwood Park, East Grinstead, Sussex); square, 1807
 Johann Baptist Streicher: grand, 1867 (today in Geelvinck Early Piano Museum, Amsterdam, Netherlands)
 Anton Walter und Sohn: square, c.1800
 Wilson: square, 1789
 Robert Woffington: upright, c.1800 (today in Geelvinck Early Piano Museum, Amsterdam, Netherlands)
 Johannes Zumpe and Gabriel Buntebart: square, 1769 (today in Geelvinck Early Piano Museum, Amsterdam, Netherlands)

Others

 Anon: cylinder musical box with drum and bells, c.1895
 Busson: piano accordion, c.1850
 Chappell and Company: keyboard crystallophone (or 'pianino'), c.1815 (today in Geelvinck Music Museum, Zutphen, Netherlands); digitorium, c.1870
 Paul Lochmann: symphonion (disc musical box), c.1895
 Thomas Machell and Sons: dulcitone, c.1920 (today in Geelvinck Music Museum, Zutphen, Netherlands)
 J Tait: angelica (musical glasses), c.1815

Related publications

Burnett, R: English Pianos at Finchcocks, Early Music (1985)
Burnett, K and R: Finchcocks Past & Present (2003)
Dow, W: Finchcocks Collection, Catalogue: the Richard Burnett Collection of Historical Keyboard *Instruments (1989)

See also 
 List of music museums

References

External links
 Finchcocks Charity for Musical Education and Richard Burnett Heritage Collection of Historical Keyboard Instruments
 Finchcocks Residential Piano School

Country houses in Kent
Music museums in England
Museums in the Borough of Tunbridge Wells
Musical instrument museums in England
Defunct museums in England
Grade I listed houses in Kent
Houses completed in 1725